Just Cabot i Ribot (Barcelona, 1898 - Paris, 1961) was a Catalan writer and journalist. He was an editor for La Publicitat and then for the new journal L'Esport Català founded by :ca:Amadeu Hurtado.

References

1898 births
1961 deaths
Journalists from Catalonia